The  is an embankment dam near Ibigawa, Ibi District, Gifu Prefecture in Japan. The dam was completed in 2008 and will support a 153 MW hydroelectric power station that is expected to be fully operational in 2015. Currently, Unit 1 at 23 MW was commissioned in May 2014. The dam was originally intended to withhold the upper reservoir of a 400 MW pumped-storage power station until a design change in 2004. The dam is also intended for flood control and water supply. It is the largest dam by structural volume in Japan and withholds the country's largest reservoir by volume as well.

History
In December 1957, Electric Power Development Company (J-Power) selected the Ibi River for study at the 23rd Electric Power Development Coordinating Meeting. By May 1976, the Ministry of Construction released their bulletin "Policy on Tokuyama Dam Construction Project". In December 1982, the project was incorporated into the Electric Power Development Basic Plan. It was approved by the government in 1998. The original project was a pumped-storage hydroelectric scheme which consisted of the Tokuyama Dam as the upper reservoir, the Sugihara Dam as the lower and the 400 MW Sugihara Power Plant.

The dam is named after the village that once stood there, that was flooded by the construction of the dam.

Construction on the dam started in May 2000 but by May 2004 J-Power and Chubu Electric announced they had changed the design of the project due to the concerns and protests of locals and groups. Instead of the pumped-storage hydroelectric scheme, only the Tokuyama Dam would be constructed with a 153 MW conventional power station. Subsequently, the Sugihara Dam and Sugihara Power Plant were scrapped from the project.
Hattoku Bridge was constructed upstream. Sediment from the Yokoyama Dam's reservoir was used as fill as well. In September 2006 initial filling of the reservoir behind the Tokuyama Dam began and by June 2008, the dam was complete. Filling was complete in September. In October of the same year, J-Power passed oversight of the power station construction to Chubu. The first generator, Unit 1, was commissioned on 15 May 2014. Unit 2 should be commissioned by June 2015.

Design
The dam will support two Francis turbine-generators, one with a 130 MW capacity which will be located in an underground power station downstream. The second is an operational 23 MW generator and is located at the base of the dam. The installed capacity of both will be 153 MW.

References

External links

Chubu Electric new projects

Hydroelectric power stations in Japan
Rock-filled dams
Dams in Gifu Prefecture
Dams completed in 2008
Underground power stations
2008 establishments in Japan
Ibi District, Gifu